Thomas Fairfax, 5th Lord Fairfax of Cameron MP (16 April 1657 – 6 January 1710 N.S.) was an English nobleman and politician.

Life
Thomas Fairfax was born on 16 April 1657, the great-grandson of Thomas Fairfax, 1st Lord Fairfax of Cameron of the Scottish peerage, not to be confused with his cousin and Civil War leader Thomas Fairfax, 3rd Lord Fairfax of Cameron.  His father was Henry Fairfax, 4th Lord Fairfax of Cameron and his mother was Frances Barwick.

Career

Fairfax graduated from Magdalen College, Oxford in 1675 and served in the Yorkshire Militia under the Earl of Danby. After the Glorious Revolution in 1688, he was appointed Lt-Colonel of Lord Castleton's Regiment of Foot, a new regiment raised to fight in the Nine Years' War. In 1694, William III made him Colonel of a Regiment of Foot and he was promoted to Brigadier in 1696, shortly before the Treaty of Ryswick ended the war in 1697. He left military service in 1703 as a Major-General.

In 1690 and 1695, he was a Member of Parliament generally supporting the Tory interest, although the modern concept of political parties did not yet apply. He was able to sit in the English Parliament because his title was part of the Scottish peerage; after the 1707 Act of Union, Scottish peers were disqualified and he was required to give up his seat.

In 1704, Fairfax obtained a three-year licence from Queen Anne to search for wrecks and treasure in the West Indies but the venture was a financial failure. He died on 6 January 1710.

Family
In 1685, Fairfax married Catherine Colepepper, daughter of Thomas Colepeper, 2nd Baron Colepeper, and they had seven children: Thomas Fairfax, 6th Lord Fairfax of Cameron, Henry Colpepper Fairfax, Katherine Fairfax, Margaret Fairfax, Frances Fairfax, Mary Fairfax, Robert Fairfax.

See also
List of deserters from James II to William of Orange

References

1657 births
1710 deaths
3rd The King's Own Hussars officers
Alumni of Magdalen College, Oxford
Thomas Fairfax, 5th Lord Fairfax of Cameron
Tory MPs (pre-1834)
English MPs 1685–1687
English MPs 1689–1690
English MPs 1690–1695
English MPs 1695–1698
English MPs 1698–1700
English MPs 1701
English MPs 1701–1702
Culpeper family
Lords of Parliament (pre-1707)
Lords Fairfax of Cameron